Jaintia may refer to:

 Jaintia people, also known as Synteng or Pnar, a tribe of Meghalaya, India
 Jaintia language, spoken by the Jaintia people
 Jaintia Kingdom, a former kingdom in present-day North-East India
 Jaintia Hills district, an administrative district in Meghalaya, India

See also 

 Jaintiapur Upazila, an administrative division of Bangladesh
 Jaintia Rajbari,  residence of Kings of Jaintia Kingdom